Leucosyrinx kantori is a species of sea snail, a marine gastropod mollusk in the family Pseudomelatomidae, the turrids and allies.

Description
The length of the shell attains 21.5 mm, its diameter 9.5 mm.

(Original description) The white shell is covered with a brownish olive periostracum. The shell contains five or more moderately rounded whorls exclusive of the (lost) protoconch. The suture is distinct with a wide rounded ridge in front of it, forming the posterior boundary of the anal fasciol The spiral sculpture consists of a few obscure threads on the fasciole and in front of the shoulder 8 or 9, on the body whorl 15 to 18 flattish, rather close-set threads smaller and closer anteriorly and absent from the siphonal canal. The axial sculpture consists of more or less distinct incremental lines, and on the upper spire of about 15 very oblique anteriorly protracted riblets chiefly visible at the shoulder and obsolete on or entirely absent from the last two whorls. The anal sulcus is wide, deep, rounded, the fasciole slightly impressed. The outer lip is thin, sharp and arcuately produce The inner lip is erased. The columella is short, white, obliquely attenuated in front. The siphonal canal is short, wide, distinct and slightly recurved.

Distribution
This marine species occurs off California, USA.

References

 McLean, 1995: Three additional new genera and two replacement names for northeastern Pacific prosobranch gastropods; The Nautilus v.108 (1994-1195)

External links
 

kantori
Gastropods described in 1995